Mr. Bean is a British comedy television programme.

Mr. Bean may also refer to:

Mr. Bean franchise 
 Mr. Bean (character), the central character of the series, played by Rowan Atkinson
 "Mr. Bean" (Mr. Bean episode), the 1990 pilot episode of the programme
 Mr. Bean: The Animated Series, since 2002
 Bean (film), a 1997 British–American comedy film
 Mr. Bean's Holiday, a 2007 British comedy film

Other uses 
 Mr Bean (company), a Singaporean soy milk and soybean curd retailer

See also 
 Bean (name)